Old Chichawatni is the older part of the city of Chichawatni, Pakistan.

References

Populated places in Sahiwal District